Augusto Premoli or Luis Máximo Premoli (29 November 1925 – 16 November 2018) was an Argentine modern pentathlete. He competed at the 1948 Summer Olympics.

References

External links
 

1925 births
2018 deaths
Argentine male modern pentathletes
Olympic modern pentathletes of Argentina
Modern pentathletes at the 1948 Summer Olympics
20th-century Argentine people
21st-century Argentine people